The Piusa ( Piuza or  Pimzha) is a river in Southeastern Estonia and, for the last 14 km before draining into Lake Pihkva, in Pskov Oblast, Russia. For a 17-km-long section near Pechory Piusa is the border river between Estonia and the Russian Federation.

The Piusa has the greatest drop of all Estonian rivers (214 metres).

See also
Hiking trail of the Piusa River
Piusa Ancient Valley Holiday Complex

References

Landforms of Põlva County
Rivers of Estonia
Rivers of Pskov Oblast
Landforms of Võru County
International rivers of Europe
Estonia–Russia border
Border rivers